Local elections were held in Bulacan on May 9, 2016, as part of the 2016 Philippine general election. Voters selected their candidates of choice for all local positions: a town mayor, vice mayor and town councilors, as well as members of the Sangguniang Panlalawigan, the vice-governor, governor and representatives for the four districts of Bulacan and the lone district of San Jose del Monte.

Gubernatorial and Vice Gubernatorial election

Governor
Incumbent Governor Wilhelmino Sy-Alvarado ran for his third and final term. His notable opponents were former Governor and Philippine Postal Corporation Postmaster Josefina dela Cruz, who substituted his brother, former governor and incumbent congressman Joselito Mendoza, and incumbent San Miguel Mayor Roderick Tiongson.

Vice Governor
Incumbent Vice Governor Daniel Fernando ran for a third and final term. His opponents were fellow film actor Phillip Salvador and former Vice Governor and former 2nd district representative Willie Villarama.

Congressional elections

1st District
Incumbent Ma. Victoria Sy-Alvarado is term-limited; her son Jose Antonio will run for the seat. His opponent was First District Board Member Michael Fermin.

2nd District
Gavini "Apol" Pancho was the incumbent.

3rd District
Joselito Mendoza is the incumbent. His opponent was former Representative and former San Rafael Mayor Lorna Silverio.

4th District
Incumbent Linabelle Villarica will run for her third and final term. Her opponent is Meycauayan City Mayor Joan Alarilla.

San Jose del Monte
Incumbent Arthur B. Robes is term-limited and opted to run for Mayor of San Jose del Monte. His wife, Rida Robes, ran for congresswoman, opposing the incumbent vice mayor Eduardo Roquero, Jr.

Sangguniang Panlalawigan Elections
All 4 Districts of Bulacan will elect Sangguniang Panlalawigan or provincial board members. The first (including Malolos) and fourth (including San Jose del Monte) districts sends three board members each, while the second and third districts sends two board members each. Election is via plurality-at-large voting; a voter can vote up to the maximum number of board members his district is sending.

1st District
Board Members Ayee Ople and Toti Ople were the incumbents. Incumbent Board Member Michael Fermin ran for a seat in Congress. Also running is comedian-actor Long Mejia.

|-bgcolor=black
|colspan=8|

2nd District
Board Member Buko dela Cruz is the remaining incumbent; Incumbent Senior Board Member Monet Posadas was term-limited and replaced by Ma. Lourdes "Baby Monet" Posadas.

|-bgcolor=black
|colspan=8|

3rd District
Nono Castro was the remaining incumbent. Incumbent Board Member Ernesto Sulit died in 2014, he was replaced by his daughter Norinyl Sulit-Villanueva; Sulit-Villanueva, however, did not seek reelection.

|-bgcolor=black
|colspan=8|

4th District
Allan Ray Baluyut was the remaining incumbent. Incumbent Board Members Jon-jon delos Santos and King Sarmiento were term-limited.

|-bgcolor=black
|colspan=8|

City and Municipal Elections
All cities and municipalities of Bulacan also elected their new mayor and vice-mayor in this election. The candidates for mayor and vice mayor with the highest number of votes won the respective seats; they were voted separately, and may therefore have derived from different parties. Below is the list of mayoralty candidates of each city and municipalities per district.

1st District
City: Malolos
Municipalities:  Bulakan, Calumpit, Hagonoy, Paombong, Pulilan

Malolos City
Mayor Christian Natividad is the incumbent. His opponent is incumbent Councilor Laurens (Didis) Domingo.

Vice Mayor Gilbert (Bebong) Gatchalian is the incumbent.

Bulakan
Mayor Patrick Neil Meneses is the incumbent.

Vice Mayor Alberto "Berting" Bituin is the incumbent. His main opponent is former PBA player and currently collegiate basketball coach Vergel Meneses.

Calumpit
Mayor Jessie de Jesus is the incumbent.

Vice Mayor Zacarias Candelaria is the incumbent.

Hagonoy
Mayor Raulito "Amboy" Manlapaz, Jr. is the incumbent.

Vice Mayor Pedro "Kap" Santos is the incumbent.

Paombong
Mayor Isagani "Gani" Castro is the incumbent. His main opponents are incumbent Vice Mayor Marisa Ramos, Mary Anne Marcos, wife of former Mayor Donato Marcos and incumbent Councilor Frank Valencia.

Pulilan
Incumbent Mayor Vicente Esguerra Sr. is term-limited. His party nominated Maritz Ochoa-Montejo who was attempting to be a first female mayor of Pulilan. Her opponent was incumbent Councilor Richard Nethercott.

Incumbent Vice Mayor Elpidio Castillo is term-limited. His son, Carlo, ran for his seat but lost to incumbent Councilor Ricardo Candido.

2nd District
Municipalities: Balagtas, Baliuag, Bocaue, Bustos, Guiguinto, Pandi, Plaridel

Balagtas
Incumbent Mayor Romeo "Romy" Castro is term-limited.

Incumbent Vice Mayor Emmanuel "Lito" Galvez was an unsuccessful candidate for mayor.

Baliwag
Mayor Carolina Dellosa is the incumbent.

Vice Mayor Christopher Clemente is the incumbent.

Bocaue
Incumbent Eduardo "Jon-Jon" J. Villanueva, Jr. is term-limited; his sister Eleanor "Joni" J. Villanueva-Tugna will run in his place. Her main opponents are former Vice Mayor Jose Santiago, Jr. and former Bulacan Provincial Administrator Jim Valerio.

Villanueva won via coin toss, 3-0 in a best-of-five playoff, after she tied with Valerio who got 16,694 votes.

Dioscoro (Coro) Juan, Jr. is the incumbent. His main opponent is the incumbent Councilor Aldrin (ABS) Sta. Ana.

Bustos
Mayor Arnel Mendoza is the incumbent.

Vice Mayor Leonida (Loida) Rivera is the incumbent.

Guiguinto
Mayor Ambrosio "Boy" Cruz, Jr. is the incumbent; his opponent was former Mayor Isagani "Gani" Pascual.

Vice Mayor Banjo Estrella is the incumbent; his opponent was former Vice Mayor Pute Aballa.

Pandi
Mayor Enrico "Rico" Roque is the incumbent.

Plaridel
Incumbent Mayor Jocell Vistan-Casaje is running unopposed.

3rd District
Municipalities: Angat, Doña Remedios Trinidad, Norzagaray, San Ildefonso, San Miguel, San Rafael

Angat
Leonardo (Narding) de Leon is the incumbent. His opponent is the incumbent Vice Mayor Reynante (Jowar) Bautista.

Doña Remedios Trinidad
Mayor Ronaldo (RTF) Flores is the incumbent.

Norzagaray
Mayor Alfredo (Fred) Germar is the incumbent; his opponent is the incumbent Vice Mayor Arthur Legaspi.

The main candidates for the Vice Mayoralty race are the incumbent Councilors Jun-Jun Saplala and Ade Cristobal.

San Ildefonso
Mayor Gerald Galvez is the incumbent.

San Miguel
Due to the term limitation of incumbent Mayor Roderick DG. Tiongson, Municipal Administrator Ferdinand Tiongson took his luck to be the next Mayor. He opposed the Incumbent Vice Mayor Marivee Mendez-Coronel, who attempted to the first female Mayor of San Miguel, Bulacan. Other candidates were Mike Dela Cruz, son of former Mayor Juan Dela Cruz, and 2010 election candidate Allen Santos Dela Cruz.

San Rafael
Incumbent Mayor Cipriano (Goto) Violago is running unopposed.

Incumbent Vice Mayor Edison Veneracion is running unopposed.

4th District
Cities: Meycauayan, 
Municipalities: Marilao, Obando, Santa Maria

Meycauayan City

Due to term limitation, Incumbent City Mayor Joan Alarilla is taking her luck to be the next House Representative of 4th District of Bulacan. Her daughter Judy is running for Mayor under the Nationalist People's Coalition and her opponent was Atty. Henry Villarica, the husband of Congresswoman Linabelle Villarica who is running under the Liberal Party. The other candidate is Pabling Milan, an independent candidate.

Vice Mayor Jojo Manzano is the incumbent. His opponent is incumbent Councilor Mario (Barbell) Aguirre.

Marilao

Mayor Juanito (Tito) Santiago is the incumbent.

Vice Mayor Andre Santos is the incumbent. His main opponents are incumbent Councilor Allane Sayo and Andre's former running mate, Barangay Lias Chairman Henry Lutao.

Obando
Mayor Edwin Santos is the incumbent; his opponent is former Mayor Orencio Gabriel.

Vice Mayor Zoilito "Zoy" Santiago is the incumbent; his opponent is incumbent Councilor Arvin dela Cruz.

Santa Maria
Incumbent Mayor Bartolome "Omeng" Ramos is term-limited; his son, Barangay Captain Raymond "Rejie" Ramos from Barangay Bagbaguin is his party's nominee. Main opponent for the Ramos' bid is former Vice Mayor Russel "Yoyoy" Pleyto.

Vice Mayor Rico Jude Sto. Domingo is the incumbent; his main opponent is Barangay Captain Quirino (Ricky) Buenaventura from Barangay Pulong Buhangin.

San Jose del Monte City
Mayor Reynaldo San Pedro is the incumbent; his main opponent is incumbent Lone District Representative Arthur Robes.

Incumbent Vice Mayor Eduardo Roquero, Jr. is running for Lone District Representative. The main protagonists for Vice Mayoralty race are the top two incumbent City Councilors from First District: Efren Bartolome, Jr. and Janet Reyes.

References

2016 Philippine local elections
Elections in Bulacan